Alice Through the Looking Glass is a 2016 American live-action/animated fantasy adventure film directed by James Bobin, written by Linda Woolverton and produced by Tim Burton, Joe Roth, Suzanne Todd, and Jennifer Todd. It is based on the characters created by Lewis Carroll and is the sequel to the 2010 film Alice in Wonderland. The film stars Johnny Depp, Anne Hathaway, Mia Wasikowska, Matt Lucas, Rhys Ifans, Helena Bonham Carter, and Sacha Baron Cohen and features the voices of Stephen Fry, Michael Sheen, Timothy Spall, Barbara Windsor, Matt Vogel, Paul Whitehouse, and Alan Rickman. This also features Rickman, Windsor and Andrew Sachs in their final film roles prior to their deaths. In the film, a now 22-year-old Alice comes across a magical looking glass that takes her back to Wonderland, where she finds that the Mad Hatter is acting madder than usual and wants to discover the truth about his family. Alice then travels through time (with the "Chronosphere"), comes across friends and enemies at different points of their lives, and embarks on a race to save the Hatter before time runs out.

The film premiered in London on May 10, 2016, and was theatrically released on May 27, 2016, by Walt Disney Studios Motion Pictures. Alice Through the Looking Glass received generally negative reviews from critics, who praised its visuals but criticized its story. The film was commercially unsuccessful, grossing roughly $299 million against a production budget of $170 million.

Plot

Alice Kingsleigh has spent the past three years following her father's footsteps and sailing the high seas. Upon her return to London from China, she learns that her ex-fiancé, Hamish Ascot, has taken over his deceased father's company and plans to have Alice sign over her father's ship in exchange for her family home.  Alice follows a butterfly she recognizes as Absolem the Butterfly, who was previously a caterpillar, and returns to Wonderland through a mirror. Alice is greeted by the White Queen, the White Rabbit, the Tweedles, the Dormouse, the March Hare, the Bloodhound and the Cheshire Cat. They inform her that the Mad Hatter is acting madder than usual because his family is missing.

Alice tries to console him, but he remains certain that his family survived the attack of the Jabberwocky. The White Queen, believing that finding the Hatter's family is the only way to restore his health, sends Alice to consult Time and convince him to save the Hatter's family in the past. The White Queen warns Alice that history will be destroyed if a person's past and present selves meet. Upon entering the Castle of Eternity, Alice finds the Chronosphere, an object that controls all of time in Wonderland. After Time tells Alice that altering the past is impossible, she steals the Chronosphere and travels back in time, shortly after finding the exiled Red Queen in Time's care. The Red Queen orders Time to pursue Alice, who accidentally travels to the Red Queen's coronation. There, a younger Mad Hatter mocks the Red Queen when the royal crown does not fit her abnormal head. When her crown breaks, the Red Queen throws a tantrum that causes her head to swell. Her father deems her unfit to rule and passes the title of queen to her younger sister, the White Queen.

Alice learns of an event in both the Queens' pasts that causes friction between the two, and she travels back in time again, hoping to change the Red Queen's character and stop the Jabberwocky from killing the Hatter's family. The young White Queen steals a tart from her mother and leaves the crumbs by her red sister's bed. When confronted by their mother, she lies and lets her sister take the blame, causing the red princess to run out of the castle. Alice sees her about to run into a clock being carried across the square and believing this to be the event that changes her head she shoves the clock out of the way, but the red princess still falls and hits her head. Alice is confronted by a weakened Time, who berates her for putting all of time in danger. She runs into a nearby mirror back into the real world, where she wakes up in a mental hospital, diagnosed with female hysteria. With the help of her mother, she returns to Wonderland, where she travels to the Jabberwocky attack and discovers that the Hatter's family did not die, but were captured by the Red Queen's Red Knights.

Returning to the present, Alice discovers the Mad Hatter at the brink of death. After Alice tearfully says she believes him, the Hatter awakens and reforms back to his normal self. The Wonderlanders go to the Red Queen's castle and find the Hatter's family shrunk and trapped in an ant farm. The Red Queen apprehends them and steals the Chronosphere from Alice, taking her sister back to the day she lied about the tart to hide behind a door and listen to the scene. The White Queen whispers 'no' as her younger self denies stealing the tart and the Red Queen is so furious she burst through the door and screams 'liar' at the White princess. The red princess sees the Red Queen (herself) creating a time paradox, and first their faces and bodies rust before all of Wonderland rusts. 

Using the Chronosphere, Alice and the Hatter race back to the present, where Alice runs for her life to place the Chronosphere back in its original place. Initially the rust outruns her but she is stopped with her hand just above the stand - sparks make the connection and everything un-rusts. The Mad Hatter reunites with his family. The White Queen apologizes to her sister for lying, which is what the Red Queen wanted. Alice bids her friends farewell and returns to the real world where her mother refuses to turn Alice's ship over to Hamish, and the two set to travel the world on behalf of their own company.

Cast
 Johnny Depp as Tarrant Hightopp / Mad Hatter
 Louis Ashbourne Serkis as Young Tarrant Hightopp
 Mia Wasikowska as Alice Kingsleigh
 Anne Hathaway as Mirana / White Queen
 Amelia Crouch as Young Mirana
 Helena Bonham Carter as Iracebeth / Red Queen
 Leilah de Meza as Young Iracebeth
 Sacha Baron Cohen as Time, a powerful Father Time-godlike human/clockwork hybrid who speaks in a German accent and rules over all of time "himself" in Wonderland using the Chronosphere in his castle.
 Leo Bill as Hamish Ascot, now "Lord Ascot" following his father's death.
 Matt Lucas as Tweedledee / Tweedledum
 Rhys Ifans as Zanik Hightopp, the Mad Hatter's father.
 Lindsay Duncan as Helen Kingsleigh, Alice's mother.
 Geraldine James as Lady Ascot, Hamish's mother.
 Ed Speleers as James Harcourt, an employee of the Ascots.
 Andrew Scott as Dr. Addison Bennett, a cruel psychiatric doctor.
 Richard Armitage as King Oleron, Iracebeth and Mirana's father.
 Hattie Morahan as Queen Elsemere, Iracebeth and Mirana's mother.
 Joanna Bobin as Alexandra Ascot, Hamish's wife.
 Simone Kirby as Tyva Hightopp, the Mad Hatter's mother.
 Joe Hurst as Bim Hightopp, The Mad Hatter's nephew.
 Oliver Hawkes as a Young Bim Hightopp
 Siobhan Redmond as Bumalic Hightopp, The Mad Hatter's sister.
 Frederick Warder as Poomally Hightopp, The Mad Hatter's brother.
 Eve Hedderwick Turner as Baloo Hightopp, The Mad Hatter's other sister.
 Tom Godwin as Pimlick Hightopp, The Mad Hatter's other brother.

Voice cast

 Alan Rickman as Absolem the Butterfly (formerly the Caterpillar)
 Stephen Fry as Cheshire
 Michael Sheen as Nivens McTwisp / White Rabbit
 Timothy Spall as Bayard Hamar / Bloodhound
 Kyle Hebert as Young Bayard
 Barbara Windsor as Mallymkun the Dormouse
 Matt Vogel as Wilkins, Time's long-suffering manservant who leads his Seconds.
 Paul Whitehouse as Thackery Earwicket / March Hare
 Wally Wingert as Humpty Dumpty
 Meera Syal as Nobody
 Edward Petherbridge as Gentleman Fish
 Owain Rhys Davies as Delivery Frog 
 Paul Hunter as White Chess King 
 Andrew Sachs as Mantel Clock (Uncredited)

Production

Development
The film was announced via Variety in December 2012. Bobin was first approached about the project while doing post-production work on Disney's Muppets Most Wanted. Of being asked, Bobin has said that "I just couldn't pass it up", as he has a passion for the works of Lewis Carroll as well as history in general. On January 21, 2014, the film was again retitled to Alice in Wonderland: Through the Looking Glass.

Casting
In July 2013, it was announced that Johnny Depp would return as the Hatter, with Mia Wasikowska's return confirmed the following November. In January 2014, Sacha Baron Cohen joined the cast to play Time. In May 2014, Rhys Ifans joined the cast to play Zanik Hightopp, the Mad Hatter's father. In developing the character of "Time", Bobin sought to avoid creating a "straight-up bad guy", noting that it would be "a bit dull", and also that the role in that universe already existed in the form of The Red Queen. Instead, Bobin sought to make Time a "Twit", further explaining that "There's no one better at playing the confident idiot trope than Sacha Baron Cohen", and adding that "it was very much with Sacha in mind". Additionally, Toby Jones and John Sessions were originally announced to voice Wilkins and Humpty Dumpty in the film, the roles were eventually given to Matt Vogel and Wally Wingert.

Filming
Principal photography began on August 4, 2014, at Shepperton Studios. In August 2014, filming took place in Gloucester Docks, which included the use of at least four historic ships: Kathleen and May, Irene, Excelsior, and the Earl of Pembroke, the last of which was renamed The Wonder for filming. Principal photography ended on October 31, 2014.

Music
The film's score was composed by Danny Elfman. The soundtrack was released on May 27, 2016, by Walt Disney Records. Pink recorded the song "Just Like Fire" for the film, and also covered Jefferson Airplane's "White Rabbit", only used in the film's promotional material.

Track listing
All music composed by Danny Elfman.

Release
Alice Through the Looking Glass premiered in London on May 10, 2016, and was theatrically released on May 27, 2016, in the United States by Walt Disney Pictures.

Box office
Alice Through the Looking Glass grossed $77 million in the United States and Canada and $222.4 million in other territories for a worldwide total of $299.5 million, against a production budget of $170 million. The Hollywood Reporter estimated the film lost the studio around $70 million, when factoring together all expenses and revenues.

Alice Through the Looking Glass opened in the United States and Canada on May 27, 2016, alongside X-Men: Apocalypse, and was initially projected to gross $55–60 million from 3,763 theaters over its four-day Memorial Day opening weekend, but projections were continuously revised downwards due to poor word of mouth. It had the added benefit of playing in over 3,100 3D theaters, 380 IMAX screens, 77 premium large formats and 79 D-box locations. It made $1.5 million from Thursday previews (to the first film's $3.9 million) and just $9.7 million on its first day, compared to the $41 million opening Friday of its predecessor. Through its opening weekend, it earned $26.9 million, which when compared to its predecessor's $116 million opening is down 70%. While 3D represented 71% ($82 million) of the original film's opening gross, 3D constituted only 41% ($11 million) for this sequel, with 29% coming from traditional 2D shows, 11% from IMAX, and 1% from premium large formats. It was the studio's third production with a low Memorial Day opening after Tomorrowland in 2015 and Prince of Persia: The Sands of Time in 2010. During its first week, the film grossed $40.1 million. In its second weekend, the film grossed $11.3 million (a 55.1% drop), finishing 4th at the box office.

The film was released across 43 countries (72% of its total market place) the same weekend as the US, and was estimated to gross $80–100 million in its opening weekend. It faced competition from Warcraft and X-Men: Apocalypse. It ended up grossing $62.7 million, which is well below the projections of which $4.1 million came from IMAX shows. It had an opening weekend gross in Mexico ($4.5 million), Brazil ($4.1 million), and Russia ($3.9 million). In the United Kingdom and Ireland, it had an unsuccessful opening by grossing just £2.23 million ($3.1 million) during its opening weekend, a mere 21% of the first film's £10.56 million ($15.2 million) opening from 603 theaters. It debuted in second place behind X-Men: Apocalypse which was on its second weekend of play. In China, it had an opening day of an estimated $7.3 million and went on to score the second biggest Disney live-action (non-Marvel or Lucasfilm) opening ever with $26.6 million, behind only The Jungle Book. However, this was down from its $35–45 million projections. It debuted at the No. 1 spot among newly released film in Japan with $5.2 million and $4.1 million on Saturday and Sunday. By comparison, the first film opened with $14 million on its way to a $133.6 million a total.

Home media
Alice Through the Looking Glass was released on Blu-ray, DVD, Blu-ray 3D and digital download on October 18, 2016, by Walt Disney Studios Home Entertainment. It debuted at No. 2 in the Blu-ray Disc sales charts.

Reception
The website's critical consensus reads, "Alice Through the Looking Glass is just as visually impressive as its predecessor, but that isn't enough to cover for an underwhelming story that fails to live up to its classic characters." Audiences polled by CinemaScore gave the film an average grade of "A−" on an A+ to F scale, the same grade earned by its predecessor, while those at PostTrak gave it an overall positive score of 79% and a "definite recommend" of 51%.

Stephen Holden of The New York Times wrote in his review, "What does all this have to do with Lewis Carroll? Hardly anything" and that overall, "It's just an excuse on which to hang two trite overbearing fables and one amusing one". Ty Burr of The Boston Globe gave the movie 1.5 out of 4 stars and called the film, "gaudy, loud, complacent, and vulgar." Stephen Whitty of New York Daily News called the film "hugely expensive and extravagantly stupid" and that, overall, the movie "is just one more silly Hollywood mashup, an innocent fantasy morphed into a noisy would-be blockbuster". Matt Zoller Seitz of RogerEbert.com was deeply critical of Alice Through the Looking Glass, calling it "junk rehashed from a movie that was itself a rehash of Lewis Carroll" and describing it as "the most offensive kind of film" due to its blockbuster tropes, lack of magic and wonder, and perceived sole purpose of financial gain.

Kyle Smith of New York Post gave the film a positive review: "The screenplay (by Linda Woolverton) isn't exactly heaving with brilliant ideas, but it works well enough as a blank canvas against which the special-effects team goes bonkers". Matthew Lickona of San Diego Reader said that while he found the visual effects to be "stupidly expensive" and the story familiar, he called it, "a solid kids’ movie in the old style".

Accolades

See also
 Through the Looking-Glass, 1871 novel by Lewis Carroll

References

External links

 
 
 
 
 

2016 3D films
2010s fantasy adventure films
2016 films
American 3D films
American fantasy adventure films
American films with live action and animation
Alice in Wonderland (franchise)
American sequel films
2010s English-language films
Films scored by Danny Elfman
Films based on Alice in Wonderland
Live-action films based on Disney's animated films
Films directed by James Bobin
Films produced by Joe Roth
Films produced by Tim Burton
High fantasy films
IMAX films
Films using motion capture
Films with screenplays by Linda Woolverton
Films shot at Longcross Studios
Films shot at Shepperton Studios
Films about size change
Films about time travel
Walt Disney Pictures films
Films set in psychiatric hospitals
Films about time
Films set in 1875
Films set in castles
Films set in London
Films set in the Victorian era
Films shot in Gloucestershire
Films shot in Surrey
Films produced by Suzanne Todd
Albums produced by Oscar Holter
2010s American films